Katakan Katamu (lit. Say Your Say) is the Indonesian format of television game show Bruce Forsyth's Hot Streak. In this quiz, 4 teams (2 boys and 2 girls), 5 persons for each team, will examined the knowledge of the vocabulary and played in single-elimination tournament mode. Katakan Katamu is aired on ANTV from 4 October 2010 to 17 June 2011, hosted by Ben Kasyafani. Previously aired on TPI (now MNCTV)  in 5 years renamed Komunikata (2000-2005).

Showtime

Preliminary round

Preliminary round is played twice, each game plays a katakan katamu round and a  gaya round.

Katakan Katamu (Say your Say)

Two gender-specific teams of five contestants each compete in a game of word association. The challengers, or winners of a coin toss in the case of two new teams, play first. In round one, the captain of the team in control chooses one of two words presented by the host. The other four team members wear headphones to ensure they could not hear the word. The opposing team played the other word in the round. Once a word was chosen, the team was given 40 seconds to communicate the word down the line. The team captain describes the word to the second team member, who, after guessing the word, then does the same for the third team member. The process continues down the line until the team completes the transition down the line, time runs out, the team gave an illegal clue, using trademarks, using a foreign language, repeated a key word, gestured or said the word (or a form of the word).

gaya (Guess the Style)

In this round, 4 categories that played (each team played 2 categories). Each categories has 5 words. This round is played turnly, started from the lowest-score team. Each round played in 60 seconds. Team captain acted as illustrator. The rules: do not making noise, do not showing the things from question word, only moving the body. The word that guessed correctly will be given 10 points. Team with the biggest cumulative score will played in playoff round. If the both team have a same score, will playing tie-break round. This round only playing with 1 category and 1 word. If lose the game, other team will win the game.

Playoff round

The two teams that winning the previous round playing again katakan katamu round and  gaya round, this round played 2 words in katakan katamu play-off and 2 category in  gaya play-off, and then the team that having the highest score will playing in sikat habis round.

Sikat habis (Clean up)

This round only played by the winners from the play-off round. This round will playing with 3 categories. Captain team will giving 4 words that related with this category and other 4 teams using headphone and standing up turning back from viewers to prevent cheating. After 4 words is guessed by captain team, 4 teams take off the headphone and standing up facing viewers.

Prizes

For the regular katakan katamu: (Monday-Thursday)
 1st category: Each guessed words will be given Rp500.000,00. All 4 guessed words will given Rp2.000.000,00. Played in 20 seconds. Each person has 5 seconds to guess the related words.
 2nd category: Each guessed words will be given Rp1.000.000,00. All 4 guessed words will be given Rp4.000.000,00. If totalled, the money in present are Rp6.000.000,00. Played in 20 seconds. Each person has 5 seconds to guess the related words.
 3rd category: If 4 member teams guessing all the words, the prize will be doubled become Rp12.000.000,00. If there one word unguessed, captain team only getting the prize that formulated from 1st category prize add 2nd category prize. Played in 16 seconds. Each person has 4 seconds to guess the related words.

But, the format of the katakan katamu all-star (lit. Katakan Katamu Bintang-Bintang) is different.
 1st category: Each guessed words will be given Rp500.000,00. All 4 guessed words will given Rp2.000.000,00. Played in 20 seconds. Each person has 5 seconds to guess the related words.
 2nd category: Each guessed words will be given Rp500.000,00. All 4 guessed words will given Rp2.000.000,00. If totalled, the money in present are Rp4.000.000,00. Played in 20 seconds. Each person has 5 seconds to guess the related words.
 3rd category: Each guessed words will be given Rp1.000.000,00. All 4 guessed words will given Rp4.000.000,00. If totalled, the money in present are Rp8.000.000,00. Played in 20 seconds. Each person has 5 seconds to guess the related words.
 4th category: If 4 member teams guessing all the words, the prize will be doubled become Rp16.000.000,00. If there is one word unguessed, captain team only gets the prize that formulated from 1st category prize add 2nd category prize add 3rd category prize. Played in 16 seconds. Each person has 4 seconds to guess the related words.

See also

 antv
 Bruce Forsyth's Hot Streak

External links
  Official Site of Katakan Katamu

Quiz shows
Television series by Fremantle (company)
2010 Indonesian television series debuts
2011 Indonesian television series endings